Milton Saul Gwirtzman (March 17, 1933 in Rochester, New York – July 23, 2011 in Bethesda, Maryland) was an American author, speech writer, lobbyist, and lawyer within international law. He was educated at Harvard University and Yale Law School. He is best remembered as a key advisor and speech writer for the Kennedy family; having close associations with the lives and careers of John F. Kennedy, Robert F. Kennedy and Ted Kennedy.

References

1933 births
2011 deaths
American lobbyists
American male writers
Harvard University alumni
Yale Law School alumni
Writers from Rochester, New York
Deaths from melanoma
Deaths from cancer in Maryland
20th-century American lawyers